A yearbook is an annual commemorative book published by an institution, often a school or university.

Yearbook may also refer to:

Books
 Year Books, law reports from England from the 13th through 16th centuries
 Year Book Medical Publishers, an American medical publishing firm that merged with C. V. Mosby into Mosby–Year Book
 Museums and Galleries Yearbook, a catalog of UK museums and galleries
 Yearbook.com, also known as MyYearbook, a social networking service currently owned by Quepasa Corporation

Film and TV
 Yearbook (TV series), a TV documentary film made by the FOX Network
"The Yearbook" (1991) Season 4 Episode 19 of The Wonder Years

Music
 The Yearbook (album), album by rapper KJ-52
 "Yearbook", a song on the Hanson album Middle of Nowhere